Cornelis Johannes "Cesar" Zuiderwijk, (born 18 July 1948) is a Dutch drummer. He is best known as the drummer of the Dutch rock band Golden Earring from 1970 until their retirement in 2021.

Biography
When Zuiderwijk was twelve he started playing the guitar, but switched to drums two years later. He has been a drummer in a number of bands; his school band René & His Alligators, plus Hu & the Hilltops and Livin' Blues.

He was asked to replace Golden Earring drummer Sieb Warner in 1970. Since then, apart from brief line-ups of five (with Robert Jan Stips and later Eelco Gelling), Golden Earring has consisted of the same four friends (Zuiderwijk, George Kooymans, Barry Hay and Rinus Gerritsen). Zuiderwijk is known to add a drum solo to each performance, which he concludes by launching himself over his drum kit.

In September 1992, Zuiderwijk and his Golden Earring bandmates joined at least a thousand other drummers to play "Radar Love" on the Maasvlakte in Rotterdam. In 1999 he was invited by War Child to teach children in the Bosnian town Mostar, to play drums. In 2000 he went on tour with Percossa Percussion as members of Golden Earring took a year off. The theatre show "Alle gekheid met een stokje" consisted of sketches, drum escapades and stories.

In 2014, Zuiderwijk was asked by Veronica DJ Silvan Stoet to attend the Spring Rhythm Event organized by the DJ and the Dutch Longfonds organization.

References

External links

Golden Earring website
Musicstation.nl (in Dutch)

1948 births
Living people
Golden Earring members
Dutch rock drummers
Male drummers
Musicians from The Hague